Etlingera foetens is a monocotyledonous plant species that was first described by Carl Ludwig von Blume, and got its current name from Rosemary Margaret Smith. Etlingera foetens is part of the genus Etlingera and the family Zingiberaceae. No subspecies are listed in the Catalog of Life.

References 

foetens
Taxa named by Rosemary Margaret Smith